Edwin Wolf II (December 6, 1911 – February 20, 1991) was an American librarian and collector who was employed by the Rosenbach Co. from 1930 to 1952.

Biography

Education and career 
Initially employed by the Rosenbach Co. (1930–1952), he took a break to join the United States Army during World War II (1943–1946), and was stationed in Europe where he participated in the recovery of ancient and rare books plundered and hidden by the Nazis. His training at Camp Ritchie’s Military Intelligence Training Center places him among the ranks of nearly 20,000 other Ritchie Boys.

He established a reputation as a scholar, published numerous articles and exhibition catalogues, and fostered collaborative projects with other Philadelphia historical institutions, including the Historical Society of Pennsylvania and the American Philosophical Society. He became President of the Friends of the University of Pennsylvania Library in 1947.

In 1952 Wolf joined the Library Company of Philadelphia as a consultant and advisor. Over the decades he was instrumental in morphing the Library Company into an active research library. He ultimately became Chief Executive Officer and was named Librarian of the Library Company.

Personal life 

Edwin Wolf II married Margaret “Peggy” Gimbel Dannenbaum in 1934. Together they had three children, Ellen, Anthony and Mary. Margaret died in a car accident in 1964. In 1965 he married Mary Paxson Matthews.

Awards and recognition 

Wolf's contributions were recognized by the 1981 Philadelphia Award, established by Edward Bok and given each year to a citizen of the Philadelphia region who, during the preceding year, acted and served on behalf of the best interests of the community.

Selected bibliography 

Wolf, Edwin. At the Instance of Benjamin Franklin: A Brief History of the Library Company of Philadelphia, 1731–1976.  The Library Company of Phil, 1976.

Wolf, Edwin, and John Francis Fleming. Rosenbach: a biography. Cleveland: World, 1960.

References 

1911 births
1991 deaths
American librarians
Presidents of the Bibliographical Society of America
Ritchie Boys